The following is a list of marathon races located in Europe.

Legend

Race list

See also

IAAF Road Race Label Events
World Marathon Majors

References

 
Marathon races